The 2019 Shandong Luneng Taishan F.C. season was Shandong Luneng Taishan's 16th consecutive season in the Chinese Super League, since the competition started with the 2004 season, and 26th consecutive season in the top flight of Chinese football overall. Shandong Luneng Taishan competed in the Chinese Super League, Chinese FA Cup and AFC Champions League.

Transfers and loans

Squad

First team squad

Reserve squad
As of 16 July 2018

Squad statistics

Appearances and goals

|-
! colspan=14 style=background:#dcdcdc; text-align:center| Players transferred out during the season

Disciplinary Record

Friendlies

Pre-season

Competitions

Chinese Super League

Table

Results summary

Results by round

Matches
All times are local (UTC+8).

Source:

Chinese FA Cup

AFC Champions League

Qualifying play-offs

Group stage

Round of 16

References

Shandong Taishan F.C. seasons
Shandong